Desulfovibrio carbinolicus is a bacterium. It is sulfate-reducing. Its cells are gram-negative, non-spore-forming, non-motile and curved. Its type strain is EDK82.

References

Further reading
Staley, James T., et al. "Bergey's manual of systematic bacteriology, vol. 3."Williams and Wilkins, Baltimore, MD (1989): 2250–2251.
Bélaich, Jean-Pierre, Mireille Bruschi, and Jean-Louis Garcia, eds. Microbiology and biochemistry of strict Anaerobes Involved in interspecies hydrogen transfer. No. 54. Springer, 1990.

External links
LPSN

Type strain of Desulfovibrio carbinolicus at BacDive -  the Bacterial Diversity Metadatabase

Bacteria described in 1987
Desulfovibrio